Tony Tiller (born December 20, 1981) is a former American football cornerback. He was signed by the BC Lions as a street free agent in 2005. He played college football at East Tennessee State.

Tiller has also been a member of the Kansas City Chiefs, Calgary Stampeders, Hamilton Tiger-Cats, Georgia Force, Atlanta Falcons and New York Sentinels.

External links
Just Sports Stats

1981 births
Living people
People from Melbourne, Florida
Players of American football from Florida
American football cornerbacks
American players of Canadian football
Canadian football defensive backs
East Tennessee State Buccaneers football players
BC Lions players
Hamilton Tiger-Cats players
Georgia Force players
Atlanta Falcons players
New York Sentinels players
Georgia State Panthers football coaches